Mick Ryan (born 19 October 1947) is an Irish rower. He competed in the men's coxed four event at the 1976 Summer Olympics.

References

1947 births
Living people
Irish male rowers
Olympic rowers of Ireland
Rowers at the 1976 Summer Olympics
Place of birth missing (living people)